Józef Rymer (1882–1922) was a Polish and Silesian activist and politician.

Rymer was born in Zabełków on February 2, 1882. Before the First World War he was an activist in the Zjednoczenie Zawodowe Polskie (Polish Union of Unions), a Polish labor union organization in Imperial Germany (see also German partition). He was also a member of the Naczelna Rada Ludowa (pro-endecja) Polish political organization in Germany. He was the target of assaults and even an assassination by nationalist German extremists (Freikorps); eventually he became one of the leaders of the Silesian Uprisings. Elected to Polish parliament (Sejm), he also became the first voivode of the Silesian Voivodeship in June 1922. On December 5 that year, he died of a stroke and was buried at Francuska Street Cemetery in Katowice.

1882 births
1922 deaths
People from Racibórz County
People from the Province of Silesia
Polish politicians
Politicians of the Silesian Voivodeship (1920–1939)
Polish trade unionists